This is a list of cases reported in volume 301 of United States Reports, decided by the Supreme Court of the United States in 1937.

Justices of the Supreme Court at the time of volume 301 U.S. 

The Supreme Court is established by Article III, Section 1 of the Constitution of the United States, which says: "The judicial Power of the United States, shall be vested in one supreme Court . . .". The size of the Court is not specified; the Constitution leaves it to Congress to set the number of justices. Under the Judiciary Act of 1789 Congress originally fixed the number of justices at six (one chief justice and five associate justices). Since 1789 Congress has varied the size of the Court from six to seven, nine, ten, and back to nine justices (always including one chief justice).

When the cases in volume 301 were decided the Court comprised the following nine members:

Notable Cases in 301 U.S.

National Labor Relations Board v. Jones and Laughlin Steel Corporation
In National Labor Relations Board v. Jones and Laughlin Steel Corporation,  301 U.S. 1 (1937) the Supreme Court upheld the constitutionality of the National Labor Relations Act of 1935, also known as the Wagner Act, ruling that Congress could regulate economic activities that were "intrastate in character when separately considered" if they held "such a close and substantial relation to interstate commerce that their control is essential or appropriate to protect that commerce from burdens and obstructions." The case represented a major expansion in the Court's interpretation of Congress's power under the Commerce Clause and effectively spelled the end to the Court's striking down of New Deal economic legislation.

United States v. Belmont
United States v. Belmont,  301 U.S. 324 (1937), was a dispute between the federal executive branch and the State of New York over property rights to a deposit from a former Russian corporation with August Belmont & Company, a private New York City banking firm. In Belmont the Supreme Court established executive predominance over state laws and constitutions in the sphere of foreign policy, and allocated the constitutional power for initiating executive agreements solely to the president of the United States.

Steward Machine Company v. Davis
In Steward Machine Company v. Davis,  301 U.S. 548 (1937), the Supreme Court upheld the unemployment compensation provisions of the Social Security Act of 1935, which established the federal taxing structure that was designed to induce states to adopt laws for funding and payment of unemployment compensation. The decision showed the Court's acceptance of a broad interpretation of Congressional power to influence state laws.

Federal court system 

Under the Judiciary Act of 1789 the federal court structure at the time comprised District Courts, which had general trial jurisdiction; Circuit Courts, which had mixed trial and appellate (from the US District Courts) jurisdiction; and the United States Supreme Court, which had appellate jurisdiction over the federal District and Circuit courts—and for certain issues over state courts. The Supreme Court also had limited original jurisdiction (i.e., in which cases could be filed directly with the Supreme Court without first having been heard by a lower federal or state court). There were one or more federal District Courts and/or Circuit Courts in each state, territory, or other geographical region.

The Judiciary Act of 1891 created the United States Courts of Appeals and reassigned the jurisdiction of most routine appeals from the district and circuit courts to these appellate courts. The Act created nine new courts that were originally known as the "United States Circuit Courts of Appeals." The new courts had jurisdiction over most appeals of lower court decisions. The Supreme Court could review either legal issues that a court of appeals certified or decisions of court of appeals by writ of certiorari. On January 1, 1912, the effective date of the Judicial Code of 1911, the old Circuit Courts were abolished, with their remaining trial court jurisdiction transferred to the U.S. District Courts.

List of cases in volume 301 U.S. 

[a] VanDevanter took no part in the case
[b] Butler took no part in the case
[c] Stone took no part in the case

Notes and references

External links
  Case reports in volume 301 from Library of Congress
  Case reports in volume 301 from Court Listener
  Case reports in volume 301 from the Caselaw Access Project of Harvard Law School
  Case reports in volume 301 from Google Scholar
  Case reports in volume 301 from Justia
  Case reports in volume 301 from Open Jurist
 Website of the United States Supreme Court
 United States Courts website about the Supreme Court
 National Archives, Records of the Supreme Court of the United States
 American Bar Association, How Does the Supreme Court Work?
 The Supreme Court Historical Society